Roi Cohen Kadosh (last name Cohen Kadosh, Hebrew: רועי כהן קדוש, born 1976) is an Israeli-British cognitive neuroscientist notable for his work on numerical and mathematical cognition and learning and cognitive enhancement. He is a professor of Cognitive Neuroscience and the head of the School of Psychology at the University of Surrey.

Biography 
Cohen Kadosh was born in Israel in 1976. He became interested in psychology at age 14, following his mother's illness and early death. After his mandatory service in the Israel Defence Forces, he started his studies at Achva College, and received his undergraduate degree in Behavioral Science from Ben-Gurion University of the Negev in 2002. Based on his achievements in his undergraduate studies, he received the prestigious Kreitman Foundation Doctoral Fellowship and was accepted to the direct track in PhD in neuropsychology with Prof. Avishai Henik. During his PhD degree (summa cum laude), he completed the European Diploma in Cognitive and Brain Sciences (EDCBS), and received training as an intern in clinical neuropsychology, at Beit Leowenstein Rehabilitation Center. He then decided to follow a research career, and received a Rothschild post-doctoral fellowship and funding from European Commission and the International Brain Research Organization to join the Institute Cognitive Neuroscience, University College London for his postdoctoral training. In 2009 he received a Wellcome Trust Career Development Fellowship to move to the University of Oxford where he established his lab. In 2021, he moved to the University of Surrey to take headship of the School of Psychology.

Research

Numerical cognition 

Cohen Kadosh started to work on numerical cognition under the supervision of Avishai Henik. His work has focused on how humans represent numbers and the psychological and biological mechanisms that support superior, typical, and impaired numerical understanding, a research with implications for a wide range of fields including Psychology, Education, and Neuroscience. His work in this field has led to significant changes in several dominant theories of numerical cognition.

Synesthesia 

Cohen Kadosh has revealed some of the cognitive and perceptual principles of synesthesia and its neurobiological mechanisms, which has implications for the field of neuroplasticity and learning. He has also suggested that the origins of synesthesia might be due to a failure in cortical specialization during infancy and childhood.

Cognitive enhancement 

Cohen Kadosh has been one of the pioneers in combining cognitive training with non-invasive brain stimulation to show its impact on cognition, learning, and brain functions. In the last years he has extended his work to examine the role of individual differences at the psychological and biological level on the impact of brain stimulation on behaviour, those allowing a better mechanistic understanding of brain stimulation and learning.

Neuroethics 

Cohen Kadosh has collaborated with neuroethicists to highlight the implications of brain stimulation for cognitive enhancement and shape the current regulation.

Select awards and honours 

 In 2009 he received The Sieratzki-Korczyn Prize for Advances in the Neurosciences.
 In 2014, the British Psychological Society announced that he would be the recipient of the Spearman Medal.
 In 2015, his book, The Stimulated Brain, was given an Honorable Mention for Biomedicine & Neuroscience at the 2015 PROSE Awards from the Association of American Publishers.

Selected works

Papers 
 2021 - Personalized Closed-Loop Brain Stimulation for Effective Neurointervention
 2019 - Suboptimal Engagement of High-Level Cortical Regions Predicts Random-Noise-Related Gains in Sustained Attention
 2018 - Learning while multitasking: short and long-term benefits of brain stimulation
 2015 - Enhancing cognition using transcranial electrical stimulation
 2015 – Linking GABA and glutamate levels to cognitive skill acquisition during development; Human Brain Mapping.
 2014 - Cognitive enhancement or cognitive cost: Trait-specific outcomes of brain stimulation in the case of mathematics anxiety; The Journal of Neuroscience.
 2013 - The mental cost of cognitive enhancement; The Journal of Neuroscience.
 2013 - Long-term enhancement of brain function and cognition using cognitive training and brain stimulation; Current Biology.
 2012 – The Neuroethics of Non-invasive Brain Stimulation; Current Biology.
 2011 – Enhanced cortical excitability in grapheme-colour synaesthesia and its modulation; Current Biology.
 2010 – Modulating Neuronal Activity Produces Specific and Long Lasting Changes in Numerical Competence; Current Biology.
 2009 – Numerical Representation in the Parietal Lobes: Abstract or not Abstract?; Behavioral and Brain Sciences.
 2007 – Notation-Dependent and -Independent Representations of Numbers in the Parietal Lobes; Neuron.
 2007 – Virtual Dyscalculia Induced by Parietal Lobe TMS Impairs Automatic Magnitude Processing; Current Biology.

Miscellaneous 
 2014 – The Neuroscience of Mathematical Cognition and Learning. An Expert Paper produced on the request of the Organisation for Economic Co-operation and Development (OECD), Paris.
 2014 – The regulation of cognitive enhancement devices (Policy Paper).

Books 
 2015 – The Oxford Handbook of Numerical Cognition
 2014 - The Stimulated Brain: Cognitive Enhancement Using Non-Invasive Brain Stimulation

References 

British neuroscientists
Spearman medal winners
Academics of the University of Oxford
Living people
1976 births